Annapurna is a 1960 Indian Telugu-language drama film genre directed by V. Madhusudan Rao.

Cast 

Jamuna as Annapurna
Jaggayya as Anand
Gummadi as Ramayya
C. S. R. as Ranganadham
Mukkamala as Narayya/Narahari
Relangi as Raja Rao
Ramana Reddy as Kotayya
Sarathi as Chandu
Dr. Sivaramakrishnaiah
Girija as Rani
 Chhaya Devi
 Master Babu as Babu

Soundtrack 

Music composed by Susarla Dakshinamurthi.

References

External links 
 

1960 directorial debut films
1960 films
1960s Telugu-language films
Films directed by V. Madhusudhana Rao
Films scored by Susarla Dakshinamurthi